Lee's Famous Recipe Chicken is a casual dining franchise founded in 1965 specializing in chicken, homestyle sides, and biscuits.

History
After the sale of KFC in 1962, Lee Cummings (the nephew of KFC founder Colonel Harland Sanders) began developing his recipe, later to be known as "Famous Recipe." In 1966, Cummings, along with Harold Omer, started "Harold's Take-Home" in Lima, Ohio, where Cummings first introduced his Famous Recipe Chicken. Later that year, Cummings opened the restaurant's first franchise in Columbus, Ohio. Locations in Springfield, Dayton, and Cincinnati, Ohio followed in the coming years, as well as a unit in Kalamazoo, Michigan.

In 1981, Cummings sold the chain to Shoney's Restaurants in Nashville, Tennessee. He died in 2002 at the age of 80. Shoney's continued to operate Lee's along with their own Captain D's and Shoney's Restaurants until 1995, when Lee's was sold to RTM Restaurant Group in Atlanta, Georgia.

In May 2003, the chain had 29 company-owned locations and 125 franchised locations. In October 2003, Lee's Famous Recipes Inc. purchased the chain from RTM. In April 2013, Famous Recipe Group LLC purchased the chain from Lee's Famous Recipes, Inc.

See also
 Fast food
 List of chicken restaurants

References

External links
 

Fast-food chains of the United States
Poultry restaurants
Restaurants in Ohio
Restaurants in Florida
Lima, Ohio
Restaurants established in 1966
1966 establishments in Ohio
Chicken chains of the United States